Guraleus diacritus is a species of sea snail, a marine gastropod mollusk in the family Mangeliidae.

Description

Distribution
This marine species is endemic to Australia and can be found off South Australia, Western Australia and Tasmania.

References

 Cotton, B.C. 1947. Some Southern Australian Turridae. South Australian Naturalist 24(3): 13-16

External links
  Tucker, J.K. 2004 Catalog of recent and fossil turrids (Mollusca: Gastropoda). Zootaxa 682:1–1295.

diacritus
Gastropods described in 1947
Gastropods of Australia